Isabel McBryde (born 16 July 1934) AO is an Australian archaeologist and professor emerita at the Australian National University (ANU) and School Fellow, in the School of Social Sciences, Faculty of Arts. McBryde is credited with training "at least three generations of Australian archaeologists" and is affectionately referred to as the "Mother of Australian Archaeology". McBryde had a "holistic" approach to studying the archaeology of Aboriginal Australia, which has been carried on by many of her students (and her students' students). McBryde has also made considerable contributions to the preservation and protection of Australian cultural heritage, particularly Aboriginal cultural heritage.

Biography 
McBryde was born in Fremantle, Western Australia on 16 July 1934. Her family moved to Melbourne not long after her birth. McBryde completed honours and master's degrees, in Latin and history, at the University of Melbourne. She received her formal archaeological training at Cambridge University where she undertook a Diploma in Prehistoric Archaeology in 1959.

In 1960, McBryde returned to Australia and was appointed as the first lecturer in prehistory and ancient history at the University of New England (UNE), the first titled position of its kind in Australia. She completed her PhD at UNE in 1966 with a regional study of the Aboriginal archaeology of the New England region of New South Wales. According to Sandra Bowdler and Genevieve Clune, her PhD was the first-ever awarded based on Australian archaeological fieldwork. At UNE, McBryde set up courses in archaeology, focusing on the "importance of regionally focused archaeology".

McBryde was appointed as senior lecturer in the Department of Prehistory and Anthropology at the ANU in 1974, and in 1986 she was appointed as the chair of prehistory. McBryde retired from ANU in 1994.

Awards and honours 
McBryde was elected as a Fellow of the Australian Academy of the Humanities in 1979.

In 1990, McBryde became an Officer of the Order of Australia (AO) for her "service to education, particularly in the field of Australian Prehistory". In 2001, McBryde received a further honour from the Australian Government, being awarded a Centenary Medal "for service to cultural heritage and as a distinguished archaeologist". McBryde remained continually involved within the world of archaeological academia with great enthusiasm, as she routinely reviewed fellow archaeological work.

In 2003, McBryde was awarded the Rhys Jones Medal for Outstanding Contribution to Australian Archaeology, which is the highest honour bestowed by the Australian Archaeological Association. In the citation for her medal it was noted that: "Few people have created such an enduring legacy for Australian archaeology. She has touched the minds, hearts and actions of virtually the entire Australian archaeological community. She is celebrated by students, Indigenous communities, colleagues and friends."

In 2005, McBryde was awarded life membership for Outstanding Contribution to the Australian Archaeological Association, an association of which she was a founding member, and also served as its first secretary in 1974–1975.

Her work is described and lauded in Billy Griffiths' 2018 award-winning book Deep Time Dreaming: Uncovering Ancient Australia.

Publications

Further reading
Many Exchanges: Archaeology, History, Community and the Work of Isabel McBryde (2005), Aboriginal History Inc.
Wil-im-ee Moor-ring: Or, Where Do Axes Come From? By Isabel McBryde (1978)

References

External links
Interview (audio)

Australian archaeologists
Living people
1934 births
Australian women archaeologists
Officers of the Order of Australia